A distillery is a premise where distillation takes place, especially distillation of alcohol.

Distillery may also refer to:
 Lisburn Distillery F.C., formerly known as Distillery, a Northern Ireland football club
 Distillery District, a heritage district in Toronto, Canada
 Distillery Guild, a group of distillers working together with common goals- a distillery association.

See also